Japanese boy band JO1 has released two studio albums, one video album, six singles, twenty promotional singles, and ten music videos with Lapone Entertainment. Formed through reality competition show Produce 101 Japan, JO1 debuted in 2020 with single Protostar and Japan Hot 100 number-one song "Infinity". The single made the group the seventh Japanese artist who managed to sell over 300,000 copies in the first week with a debut single. It was followed by single Stranger and its lead track "Oh-Eh-Oh", both peaked atop Oricon Singles Chart and Japan Hot 100, respectively. The group's first studio album The Star (2020) reached number two on the Japan Hot Albums chart.

In 2021, JO1 continued their streak by releasing three number-one singles—Challenger, Stranger and Wandering. The latter earned the group's first double platinum certification from the Recording Industry Association of Japan (RIAJ) for over a half million units in shipments. The singles subsequently supported the second album Kizuna (2022), which became the group's first number-one album on the Japan Hot Albums and Oricon Albums Chart. Their sixth single, Midnight Sun, surpassed 600,000 copies sold in its first week according to the Billboard Japan while its promotional single, "SuperCali", spent two weeks in top 6 of Japan Hot 100.

Albums

Studio albums

Video albums

Singles

As a lead artist

As featured artist

Promotional singles

Soundtrack appearances

Other charted songs

Guest appearances

Music videos

References

Footnotes
Notes for albums and songs

Notes for peak chart positions

Citations

Discographies of Japanese artists
Pop music discographies
Discography